Stalachtis phlegia is a species of butterfly of the family Riodinidae. It is found in South America.

Subspecies
Stalachtis phlegia phlegia (Surinam)
Stalachtis phlegia nocticoelum Seitz, 1917 (Brazil: Pará)
Stalachtis phlegia phlegetontia (Perty, 1833) (Brazil: Goiás and Mato Grosso, Paraguay)
Stalachtis phlegia susanna (Fabricius, 1787) (Brazil: Rio de Janeiro)
Stalachtis phlegia venezolana Seitz, 1917 (Venezuela)

References

Butterflies described in 1779
Riodininae